is a Japanese former professional baseball player and manager.

Biography
Nagashima played baseball at his local high school, and on the Rikkyo University baseball team from 1954–1957. He joined the Yomiuri Giants in 1958. His jersey number (3) is now a retired number for the Yomiuri Giants.

After retiring, he became manager of the Yomiuri Giants from 1975–1980, and again from 1993–2001. He was scheduled to manage the Japanese national team for the 2004 Athens Olympics, but he suffered a stroke shortly before and was hospitalized. He recovered from his stroke, appearing at a baseball game in the Tokyo Dome in 2005, and in a television commercial in 2006, with his son, Kazushige.

Nagashima has four children. His eldest son, Kazushige Nagashima, is a former professional baseball player, and currently works as a sportscaster. Kazushige was not as successful as his father on the field, but he played on the Yomiuri Giants when his father was manager, and has since launched a successful career as an actor and TV personality. His eldest daughter works as a businesswoman, and his younger daughter was a newscaster for TV Asahi. His youngest son is a professional race-car driver. Kazushige had twin daughters in 2004, making Nagashima a grandfather. Shigeo lost his wife, Akiko, on September 18, 2007.

Amateur career
Nagashima was actually a fan of the Hanshin Tigers, the rival of the Yomiuri Giants, during his childhood. After graduating from his local high school in Chiba, he entered Rikkyo University, and became the team's regular third baseman. He won the batting title for two consecutive years in the Tokyo Big6 Baseball League, and was given the Best Nine Award five seasons in a row at third base. By his senior year, scouts from every professional team wanted to sign Nagashima, and the Nankai Hawks and Hiroshima Carp were particularly active in recruiting Nagashima. It was almost decided that he would sign with the Hawks, but he ended up joining the Yomiuri Giants in November, 1957. He signed with the Giants for 18,000,000 yen; the highest salary for a baseball player at the time.

Professional career

Nagashima made his professional debut in April 1958, and struck out in all four of his at-bats against Masaichi Kaneda (coincidentally, Sadaharu Oh also struck out in all of his at-bats in his debut game against Kaneda). Regardless, Nagashima became the team's clean-up hitter by mid-season, and the Giants won the league championship. Nagashima led the league in HRs (29) and RBIs (92), and was awarded the rookie of the year award. He would have hit .300 with over 30 home runs and 30 steals in his rookie year, but he had one home run scratched off his record because he forgot to step on first base while rounding the bases after hitting a home run.

Nagashima played perhaps his most well-known game on June 25, 1959, when the Japanese emperor attended a baseball game for the first time. Nagashima hit the game-winning home run off Minoru Murayama, and rookie Sadaharu Oh also had a home run in the game.

The Yomiuri Giants cleanup consisting of Sadaharu Oh batting third, and Nagashima batting fourth, were nicknamed the ON Hou (translated to: Oh-Nagashima Cannon) as Nagashima continued his hitting prowess, and Oh emerged as the best hitter in the league. The Giants won the league championship nine years in a row from 1965–1973, and Oh and Nagashima dominated the batting titles during this period. Nagashima won the season MVP award five times, and the Best Nine Award every single year of his career (a total 17 times).

Nagashima won only two Golden Glove awards, because the title was established in Japan late during his career, in 1972. Nagashima was a flashy fielder, making extravagant leaps and dashes to field even the most routine ground ball. Giants fans were delighted by Nagashima's fielding, even when he made careless errors.

After winning his sixth batting title in 1971, Nagashima suddenly fell into a hitting slump. The team attempted to revive him by giving him more at-bats, but Nagashima no longer had the success he had shown during his younger years. The team wanted Nagashima to take over as manager after Tetsuharu Kawakami, who had led the team for 14 years, and Nagashima doubled as a player and a coach in his final seasons. In 1974, the Chunichi Dragons won the league championship, breaking the nine-year streak held by the Giants, and Nagashima played his final game on October 14 against the Dragons, grounding out to short for a double-play in his final at-bat. The game was followed by an elaborate retirement ceremony.

Managerial career
Nagashima's appointment as manager of the Yomiuri Giants was announced almost immediately after his retirement. Nagashima was given control of the team in November 1974, and he immediately rid the Giants of the tactical, small ball style left by his predecessor Tetsuharu Kawakami, relying instead on superior hitting and pitching to carry the team. He also recruited third baseman Davey Johnson from the majors, who became the first ever non-Japanese player to play for the Giants. The changes did not turn out well in the 1975 season, as the Giants ended the season in last place for the first time in the team's history. However, the Giants recruited star players during the off-seasons, while Nagashima made further changes (including converting a lifelong outfielder to third base) and the Giants quickly re-assumed their dominant position in the Central League, winning league championships in 1976 and 1977.

The Giants lost the pennant to the Yakult Swallows in 1978, and on October 1, former Giants manager Shigeru Mizuhara made an appearance on TV Asahi's news program, criticizing Nagashima's handling of the team. In the off-season of the same year, Nagashima and the Giants were involved in a huge controversy concerning the drafting of pitcher Suguru Egawa. The Giants ended in fifth place in 1979, and Nagashima's head coach was fired mid-season in yet another controversy. Criticism towards Nagashima greatly increased, and the team's owners decided to fire Nagashima during the 1980 season. Nagashima's immense popularity made it difficult for fans to stomach the firing, and some fans even attempted to boycott the Yomiuri newspaper in protest.

The Giants won five league championships and two championship series after Nagashima's departure, but many people felt that the sport's popularity in Japan was fading away, and called for Nagashima to be reinstated to revive Japanese baseball. Several teams sought Nagashima to become their manager, but he either refused or ignored their calls. Nagashima returned to the Yomiuri Giants in 1992, when Tsuneo Watanabe became the new owner of the team (Watanabe had a long-lasting affiliation with Nagashima). In the 1992 draft, he won the lottery to sign Hideki Matsui, who would become the new star of the Giants during Nagashima's second run as manager.

Nagashima's Giants won championships in 1994, 1996 and 2000, and he managed the team until 2001. For the 2000 Japan Series, Nagashima was managing against his former teammate, Sadaharu Oh, who was the manager for the Fukuoka Daiei Hawks. The press called it the O-N Series. In 2002, it was announced that he would lead the Japanese Olympic baseball team. The team (consisting entirely of players from the Japanese professional leagues) beat China, Taiwan, and Korea to win the Asia tournament in November 2003, but Nagashima suffered a stroke in March 2004, and was unable to travel to the Athens Olympics. The team ended up with a bronze medal in the Olympics after losing to Australia.

He was awarded People's Honour Award on May 5, 2013, for his achievement. And more coincidentally, Hideki Matsui who he had picked in draft was also awarded at the same time.

In 2021, he received the Order of Culture for the first time as a former professional baseball player.

Post-career
Nagashima was one of the torchbearers in the 2020 Summer Olympics.

As result for player era

Sourse:Nippon Professional Baseball

As result for team manager era

Sourse:Nippon Professional Baseball

See also

List of top Nippon Professional Baseball home run hitters

Notes

External links

1936 births
Living people
People from Sakura, Chiba
Baseball people from Chiba Prefecture
Japanese Baseball Hall of Fame inductees
Japanese baseball players
Managers of baseball teams in Japan
Nippon Professional Baseball MVP Award winners
Nippon Professional Baseball Rookie of the Year Award winners
Nippon Professional Baseball third basemen
Olympic baseball managers
People's Honour Award winners
Recipients of the Order of Culture
Rikkyo University alumni
Yomiuri Giants managers
Yomiuri Giants players